The International Highrise Award is an international award in architectural design. The award is bestowed to "a structure that combines exemplary sustainability, external shape and internal spatial quality, not to mention social aspects, to create a model design." 

Initiated in 2003 by the City of Frankfurt, German Architecture Museum and DekaBank it is granted in Frankfurt am Main every two years.  The prize, a statuette by artist Thomas Demand and EUR 50,000 is awarded to the planners and developers jointly.

Recipients

Bibliography 
 Michaela Busenkell (Hrsg.), Peter Cachola Schmal (Hrsg.): Best Highrises 2012/2013: Internationaler Hochhauspreis / The International Highrise Award 2012. Katalog zur Ausstellung im Deutschen Architekturmuseum Frankfurt am Main vom 17. November 2012 bis 13. Januar 2013. Edition Detail, München 2012, .

References

External links

 Offizielle Seite zum Internationalen Hochhauspreis
 Internationaler Hochhaus Preis - DekaBank (Preis-Sponsor und Mitbegründer)

2003 establishments in Germany
Architecture awards
Awards established in 2003